The Innocents Abroad, or The New Pilgrims' Progress is a  travel book by American author Mark Twain. Published in 1869, it humorously chronicles what Twain called his "Great Pleasure Excursion" on board the chartered vessel Quaker City (formerly ) through Europe and the Holy Land with a group of American travelers in 1867.

The five-month voyage included numerous side trips on land.

The book, which sometimes appears with the subtitle "The New Pilgrim's Progress", became the best-selling of Twain's works during his lifetime, as well as one of the best-selling travel books of all time.

Analysis
Innocents Abroad presents itself as an ordinary travel book based on an actual voyage in a retired Civil War ship (the ).  The excursion was billed as a Holy Land expedition, with numerous stops and side trips along the coast of the Mediterranean Sea, notably:
 train excursion from Marseille to Paris for the 1867 Paris Exhibition during the reign of Napoleon III and the Second French Empire
 journey through the Papal States to Rome
 side trip through the Black Sea to Odessa
 culminating excursion through the Holy Land

Twain reports the voyage covered over 20,000 miles of land and sea.

Twain recorded his observations and critiques of the various aspects of culture and society which he encountered on the journey, some more serious than others. Many of his observations draw a contrast between his own experiences and the often grandiose accounts in contemporary travelogues, which were regarded in their own time as indispensable aids for traveling in the region. In particular, he lampooned William Cowper Prime's Tent Life in the Holy Land for its overly sentimental prose and its often violent encounters with native inhabitants. Twain also made light of his fellow travelers and the natives of the countries and regions that he visited, as well as his own expectations and reactions.

Themes

A major theme of the book is that of the conflict between history and the modern world. Twain continually encounters petty profiteering and trivializations of history as he journeys, as well as a strange emphasis placed on particular past events. He is either outraged, puzzled, or bored by each encounter. One example can be found in the sequence during which the boat has stopped at Gibraltar. On shore, the narrator encounters seemingly dozens of people intent on regaling him, and everyone else, with a bland and pointless anecdote concerning how a particular hill nearby acquired its name, heedless of the fact that the anecdote is, indeed, bland, pointless, and entirely too repetitive. Another example may be found in the discussion of the story of Abelard and Heloise, where the skeptical American deconstructs the story and comes to the conclusion that far too much fuss has been made about the two lovers. Only when the ship reaches areas of the world that do not exploit for profit or bore passers-by with inexplicable interest in their history, such as the early passage dealing with the ship's time at the Azores, is this attitude not found in the text.

This reaction to those who profit from the past is found, in an equivocal and unsure balance with reverence, in Twain's experiences in the Holy Land. The narrator reacts here, not only to the exploitation of the past and the unreasoning (to the American eye of the time) adherence to old ways, but also to the profanation of religious history. Many of his illusions are shattered, including his discovery that the nations described in the Old Testament could easily fit inside many American states and counties, and that the "kings" of those nations might very well have ruled over fewer people than could be found in some small towns. Disillusioned, he writes, "If all the poetry and nonsense that have been discharged upon the fountains and the bland scenery of this region were collected in a book, it would make a most valuable volume to burn."

This equivocal reaction to the religious history the narrator encounters may be magnified by the prejudices of the time, as the United States was still primarily a Protestant nation at that point.  The Catholic Church, in particular, receives a considerable amount of attention from the narrator, specifically its institutionalized nature. This is particularly apparent in the section of the book dealing with Italy, where the poverty of the lay population and the relative affluence of the church are contrasted.

Adaptations

A 116 minute television movie version of the book was broadcast on the PBS series American Playhouse in 1987 and directed by Peter H. Hunt.

See also
 Travelogues of Ottoman Palestine

References

External links

 Hypertext Map from University of Virginia etext, Innocents Abroad, a part of Mark Twain in His Times
 Chapter Outlines by the Author, from Wright American Fiction at Indiana University

As a travel book, Innocents Abroad is accessible through any one of its chapters, many of which were published serially in the United States.  (A compilation of the original newspaper accounts was the subject of McKeithan (1958)).  In many of the chapters, a uniquely Twainian sentence or word stands out.  A sampling of chapter material appears below and includes links to visual representations as well as to dedicated Mark Twain projects that have included Innocents Abroad in their sweep:
 Ch.1 Holy Land tour flyer reprints The  Quaker City travel prospectus and comments on exclusivity in passenger selection.
 Ch.4 Ship Routine outlines the passengers' daily routines and their affectation of sailor language.
 Ch. 8 Tangier, Morocco "We wanted something thoroughly and uncompromisingly foreign -- foreign from top to bottom -- foreign from center to circumference -- foreign inside and outside and all around -- nothing anywhere about it to dilute its foreignness -- nothing to remind us of any other people or any other land under the sun.  And lo! in Tangier we have found it."
 Ch.11 The Prado and other Marseille tourist sites.  "We were troubled a little at dinner to-day, by the conduct of an American, who talked very loudly and coarsely. and laughed boisterously when all others were so quiet and well behaved.  He ordered wine with a royal flourish...."  Drove the Prado avenue, visited Chateau Borely, the Zoological Gardens, and the Castle d‘If.  Discussed prisoner drawings created during the years Château d'If was used as a prison.
 Ch. 12 Marseilles to Paris by Train Old Travelers; Lyon, Saône, Tonnerre, Sens, Melun, Fontainebleau "and scores of other beautiful cities"; dinner, shopping, a terrifying shave.  "Occasionally, merely for the pleasure of being cruel, we put unoffending Frenchmen on the rack with questions framed in the incomprehensible jargon of their native language, and while they writhed, we impaled them, we peppered them, we scarified them, with their own vile verbs and participles."

Reviews
 etext.virginia.edu Collection of Contemporary Reviews.
 Hirst, Robert H. "The Making of The Innocents Abroad : 1867–1872." Ph.D. diss., University of California, Berkeley, 1975.
 Howells, William Dean.  The Innocents Abroad, or the New Pilgrims Progress, The Atlantic Monthly, December 1869.
 New York Evening Post (January 20, 1883).

Secondary references

Mark Twain projects
 etext.virginia.edu -- Innocents Abroad Homepage
 Mark Twain Project at the University of California

On-line snippets
 Image of Mark Twain, on board ship in 1897, at 60 years old. (Twain traveled at age 32 and published Innocents Abroad in 1869, at the age of 34, but this image is sometimes associated with the earlier Twain.)  For comparison, see 1871 image and 1875 (approx) image

Scholarly works
 
 
 
 
 
  (covering the period from 1867 to 1871; Twain set sail on June 8, 1867, for a five-month Mediterranean tour on board the Quaker City; Innocents Abroad, detailing the Quaker City tour, was first published in 1869)

Primary sources

 Etext.virginia.edu -- Innocents Abroad Homepage
 Mark Twain Project at the University of California

 
 The Innocents Abroad, from Internet Archive. Illustrated, scanned original editions.
 Innocents Abroad (with facsimiles of original illustrations) in Wright American Fiction 1851-1875
 Lexicon from Wordie, Words rounded up while reading The Innocents Abroad by Mark Twain
 
 McKeithan, Daniel Morley, ed., Traveling with the innocents abroad; Mark Twain's original reports from Europe and the Holy Land. Norman: University of Oklahoma Press, 1958.
 on departure, as reported in June 9, 1867 New York Times
 at ship's last port of call in St. George, Bermuda
 Correspondence markers (April 1867, June 1867, and November 1867) from the Mark Twain Project
 15 April 1867 correspondence, anticipating Holy Land trip
 7 June 1867 correspondence, anticipating imminent departure on 8 June 1867.
 20 November 1867 correspondence, on arriving in New York City.

1869 books
Books by Mark Twain
American travel books